The Battle of Piacenza was fought between a Franco-Spanish army and the Austrian army near Piacenza, in Northern Italy on June 16, 1746. It formed part of later operations in the War of the Austrian Succession. The result was a victory for the Austrian forces, led by Prince Josef Wenzel.

Prince Franz Josef I and Louis-Joseph de Montcalm were among the notable combatants.

The Bourbon position
Following the battle of Bassignana and the splitting of the Austrian and Piedmontese armies, the Spanish and French armies coordinated their attack plans. Spain viewed either the capture of Turin and Milan as desirable. However, since France wished to negotiate with Charles Emmanuel, this left Spain only with Milan. Therefore, on November 28, 1745, De Gages began the Spanish invasion of Lombardy. It was not long before the Austrian commander, Prince Josef Wenzel of Liechtenstein, retired his army prior to the Spanish advance, being fearful that his undermanned army would be destroyed. Milan surrendered peacefully, and by the end of the year most of Lombardy was in Spanish hands.

In early 1746, the situation in Austria was that the Bourbon armies occupied all of Lombardy save Mantua, and approximately 1/5 of Charles Emmanuel's realm of Piedmont-Sardinia. The French court then began negotiations with Charles Emmanuel in the hope of detaching Piedmont from its alliance with Austria. At the same time, Marshal Maillebois was pressing the siege of Alessandria. By all reckoning, the Infant Philip was now master of his new realm, and the Bourbons had been triumphant in Spain.

Charles Emmanuel reopens the battle for Italy
The Treaty of Dresden, signed between Prussia and Austria on December 25, 1745, had as much impact on the fighting in Italy as it did for central Europe. Charles Emmanuel and his advisers saw this clearly. Evidently, Austria, now freed from a war in Germany, would transfer the bulk of its army to Italy. The position of France and Spain had not altered and the King realized that they would not be able to match Austria's military buildup in the peninsula.

Although still negotiating with France, the King realized that keeping his alliance with Austria was the more profitable gamble. Charles Emmanuel decided he needed to buy himself time until Austria had completed her concentration in Italy. The easiest way to obtain this was to string out the negotiations for as long as possible until it was time to act. Consequently, he gave the French court until the end of February to reach an agreement, otherwise there would be a resumption of hostilities. He also requested that the French raise the siege of Alessandria. In an extraordinary act of good faith, the French complied on February 17, 1746.

On March 1, however, when the deadline had passed and the Austrian concentration was completed, Charles Emmanuel realized that the time had come to resume the war. The Piedmontese Army slowly began to move towards the French garrison at Asti and Alessandria. Having successfully disguised his intentions, Charles Emmanuel reopened the war in Italy on March 5, 1746 with an attack on Asti. Three days later, the garrison had surrendered, and 5,000 prisoners fell into Piedmontese hands.

Bourbon retreat to Piacenza
The surrender of the garrison at Asti created major problems for the French army. Morale plummeted, and by the end of March, Marshal Maillebois' army had lost 15,000 men to desertion, illness or capture. De Gages' Spanish army sat still at Piacenza, uncertain of what course of action to take in the face of the new danger caused by the Austrian concentration. Neither he, nor the Infant Philip wished to retreat from Lombardy, fearing this would provoke anger in Madrid. Unfortunately, the Austrian command made the decision for them. By skillful maneuvering, the Austrians chased The Infant from Milan to Pavia. By April, Parma, Reggio and Guastalla had fallen to Austria. In order to concentrate their dispersed forces, the Spanish asked Marshal Maillebois to bring his French army westwards to join with the other Bourbon troops falling back on Piacenza from various directions.

Marshal Maillebois, however, was reluctant to abandon his lines of communication through Genoa and consequently only sent ten battalions forward to Piacenza. The Spanish King Philip V and his wife Elizabeth Farnese, ordered De Gages to remain at Piacenza. Louis XV, wishing to confirm Bourbon solidarity and ready to be obliging to his Spanish uncle, ordered Maillebois to place his troops under Spanish command. Reluctantly agreeing, the marshal ordered his troops to Piacenza and by June 15, the Franco-Spanish army was joined together.

Opposing plans
Since the Austrian army outnumbered De Gages' army by some 15,000 men, he worked out a plan which would make an Austrian assault costly and invite a Spanish counterstroke. He hoped this plan would win him the battle. Rejecting a stand in the crumbling town of Piacenza, Gages ordered ditches and artillery emplacements to be dug which would become a defensive line that the Austrians would have to attack. De Gages also ordered his troops to scout the areas to the north of Piacenza. Maillebois' arrival gave the Spanish general a combined strength of 40,000. However, this began to put a severe strain on the food supplies in the area. Additionally, a Piedmontese army of 10,000 men was approaching from the west which would firmly tip the balance in numbers in favor of the Austrians.

With the Piedmontese only a day's march away, the French marshal urged that an immediate attack should be launched against the Austrians. Instead of the original plan, the Spanish commander would now hold his center lightly while concentrating on the flanks. The attack on the Austrian's left would entail pushing it back towards the Austrian center. In an unorthodox move, De Gages asked Maillebois to take his troops beyond the extreme right of the line, encircle the Austrian right flank and fall on its rear. The battle was set to begin at sunrise on the 16th.

The Austrians had spent the last few months placing their artillery, seizing Bourbon outposts, and gathering food supplies. In the Austrian camp, the mood was one of confident victory. The Austrian plan was much more simple than the Bourbon one. They would let Gages waste his troops against their position. Once the attack had run out of steam, they would counter-attack. On the morning of the 15th, they began to deploy their forces to the north of Piacenza. Unfortunately for the French, Count Browne realised what Maillebois was up to and moved his units to block the French advance. The Marquis of Botta d'Adorno commanded the Austrian right and simply put his troops on the alert that evening. The Austrians then only had to wait for the Franco-Spanish attack.

The battle
On the morning of June 16, the Austrian artillery opened fire on the Bourbon camp opposite them. At the same time, the Franco-Spanish army began its assault upon the Austrian lines. Marshal Maillebois' plan began to fail a few minutes after the start of his assault. Instead of a clear descent upon the Austrian rear, the marshal was unnerved to see Browne's troops drawn up in front of him behind a canal. Furthermore, the French force had emerged in the wrong place. The narrow valley they had gone into provided a bottleneck, and as soon as they emerged they were attacked by the Austrians. The marshal tried to bring more troops into action, but his men could not get near the Austrians due to the intensity of their fire. Finally, Browne advanced his troop over the canal and the assault collapsed, many Frenchmen being cut to pieces in the narrow gully.

On the other flank, Gages had been able to advance his men right up to the Austrian lines. His troops were slowly pushing the Austrians back in what seemed to be a much more even battle. However, Baron Bärenklau finally managed to draw the Austrian cavalry into the fight causing the Spanish line to break under the pressure. With the Spanish retreating towards Piacenza, the Austrians were able to give chase. By two pm, the battle was over and so were Bourbon hopes in Italy.

The aftermath
Austria suffered about 3,400 casualties and over 700 men died. The Spanish army suffered about 9,000 casualties and the French about 4,000. Of the French and Spanish armies, about 4,500 soldiers were killed and 4,800 taken prisoner. Louis-Joseph de Montcalm was one of them. Following the battle, the Bourbons evacuated Piacenza on June 27, and were shepherded eastwards by the Austro-Piedmontese armies into the republic of Genoa.

The battle did not mark the end of the fighting in Italy and an attempt to exploit the victory by invading Provence at the end of the year ended in failure. As a result, the Austrians were released from the captured Genoa by a revolt in December, 1746.

References

Bibliography

 Browning, Reed (2008). The War of the Austrian Succession. St. Martin's Griffin. .  pp. 273–276 Bibliography pp. 403–431.

Piacenza
Piacenza 1746
Piacenza 1746
Piacenza 1746
Piacenza 1746
Piacenza 1746
1746 in Italy
1746 in Austria
1746 in France
Piacenza